Hodgson-Greene-Haldeman Shipbuilders was a wood shipbuilding company in Long Beach, California. To support the World War II demand for ships, Hodgson-Greene-Haldeman US Army passenger boats, Type B ship barges and Type V ship wood tugboatss. Before the war, Hodgson-Greene-HaldemanHodgson-Greene-Haldeman built fishing boats. At the end of the war the shipyard purchased by Long Beach Marine Repair Company, which was next to the shipyard. Long Beach Marine Repair Company closed in 1970. The Hodgson-Greene-Haldeman shipyard was located at 1409 West 7th Street, Long Beach, California. Hodgson-Greene-Haldeman was a partnership of: Frank W. Hodgson, Greene and Haldeman.

See also
 California during World War II
Maritime history of California
United Concrete Pipe Corporation

References

American Theater of World War II
Hodgson-Greene-Haldeman